Sodium-dependent glucose cotransporters (or sodium-glucose linked transporter, SGLT) are a family of glucose transporter found in the intestinal mucosa (enterocytes) of the small intestine (SGLT1) and the proximal tubule of the nephron (SGLT2 in PCT and SGLT1 in PST). They contribute to renal glucose reabsorption. In the kidneys, 100% of the filtered glucose in the glomerulus has to be reabsorbed along the nephron (98% in PCT, via SGLT2). If the plasma glucose concentration is too high (hyperglycemia), glucose passes into the urine (glucosuria) because SGLT are saturated with the filtered glucose.

Types 

The two most well known members of SGLT family are SGLT1 and SGLT2, which are members of the SLC5A gene family.  In addition to SGLT1 and SGLT2, there are 10 other members in the human protein family SLC5A. Of these, SLC5A4/SGLT3 (SAAT1) is a low-affinity transporter for glucose, but seems to have more of an electric function.

The other SLC5 proteins transport mannose, myo-inositol, choline, iodide, vitamins, and short-chain fatty acids.

SGLT2 inhibitors for diabetes 

SGLT2 inhibitors, also called gliflozins, are used in the treatment of type 2 diabetes.  SGLT2 is only found in kidney tubules and in conjunction with SGLT1 resorbs glucose into the blood from the forming urine. By inhibiting SGLT2, and not targeting SGLT1, glucose is excreted which in turn lowers blood glucose levels. Examples include dapagliflozin (Farxiga in US, Forxiga in EU), canagliflozin (Invokana) and empagliflozin (Jardiance). Certain SGLT2 inhibitors have shown to reduce mortality in type 2 diabetes. The safety and efficacy of SGLT2 inhibitors have not been established in patients with type 1 diabetes, and FDA has not approved them for use in these patients.

Function 
Firstly, an Na+/K+ ATPase on the basolateral membrane of the proximal tubule cell uses ATP molecules to move 3 sodium ions outward into the blood, while bringing in 2 potassium ions. This action creates a downhill sodium ion gradient from the outside to the inside of the proximal tubule cell (that is, in comparison to both the blood and the tubule itself).

The SGLT proteins use the energy from this downhill sodium ion gradient created by the ATPase pump to transport glucose across the apical membrane, against an uphill glucose gradient. These co-transporters are an example of secondary active transport. Members of the GLUT family of glucose uniporters then transport the glucose across the basolateral membrane, and into the peritubular capillaries. Because sodium and glucose are moved in the same direction across the membrane, SGLT1 and SGLT2 are known as symporters.  Of course, sodium can deplete, so Sodium–hydrogen antiporter gets sodium into the cell to begin with.  Therefore, glucose actually moved with net protons being pushed out of cell, sodium being the intermediate.

History 

In August 1960, in Prague, Robert K. Crane presented for the first time his discovery of the sodium-glucose cotransport as the mechanism for intestinal glucose absorption.

Crane's discovery of cotransport was the first-ever proposal of flux coupling in biology.

See also 
 Cotransport
 Cotransporter
 Glucose-galactose malabsorption
 Renal sodium reabsorption
 Discovery and development of SGLT-2 inhibitors

References

External links 
 

Solute carrier family